Zabihabad may refer to:
 Zabihabad, Golestan